Ndolo is a Bantu language spoken in the Democratic Republic of the Congo by 8,000 people. It is very close to Lingala.

References

Languages of the Democratic Republic of the Congo
Bangi-Ntomba languages